Owensboro High School is a public high school located at 1800 Frederica Street in Owensboro, Kentucky, United States. The school's digital newspaper is The Digital Devil. Owensboro High School is one of only 33 high schools in Kentucky to be listed among the "Best High Schools 2009 Search" published in U.S. News & World Report in December 2009. This was the second consecutive year that OHS has received this distinction.

Structure and schedule pattern

The school day starts at 8:30 AM and ends at 3:25 PM. Days are divided into 4, 85 minute class periods. There is also a 30 minute advisory period, along with three 25 minute lunch periods. Students typically have 4 core classes and 4 electives, making 8 classes total. Students take half of their classes on alternating days, either “Red” days, or “Black” days.

Students have multiple off-campus learning opportunities, at local colleges, universities, or Owensboro Innovation Academy, or at local businesses.

Athletics
OHS owns 29 state titles in team sports including: 
 Football 
 Boys' basketball 
 Baseball
 Track
 Cheerleading
Other sports include: 
 Girls’ basketball
 Tennis
 Golf
 Cross-country
 Swimming
 Wrestling
 Boys’ and Girls’ Lacrosse
 Bowling 
 
The sports teams and other organizations are usually titled "Red Devils." The swim team is the "Devilfish". Ordell, a red blob-like devil with horns and a tail, is the school's anthropomorphic mascot. The primary school colors are red and black, and the secondary color is white.

The Rose Curtain Players
The Rose Curtain Players is a drama group associated with Owensboro High School. It is the oldest high school drama program in Kentucky. Notable alumni include Tom Ewell.

Notable alumni
 Vince Buck, Former NFL Player
 Tom Ewell, actor
 William Gant, Kentucky Supreme Court justice
 Cliff Hagan, University of Kentucky All-American, NBA player and Naismith Hall of Fame member
 Mark Higgs, Former NFL Player
 Dave Watkins, Former MLB Catcher for Philadelphia Phillies 
 Aric Holman, Texas Legends center
 Christine Johnson Smith, Broadway actress who originated the role of Nettie Fowler of Carousel
 Justin Miller, NFL player for the Detroit Lions
 Kevin Olusola, Member of Pentatonix
 Bobby Watson, University of Kentucky player, NBA player
 Ken Willis, Former NFL Player
• Norm Johnson, International Playboy Entrepreneur

References

External links
 

Public high schools in Kentucky
Buildings and structures in Owensboro, Kentucky
Schools in Daviess County, Kentucky
Educational institutions established in 1871
1871 establishments in Kentucky
Theatre companies in Kentucky